Sonmiani Bay is located on the Arabian Sea in Lasbela District, Balochistan, Pakistan.

See also 
 Somiani Spaceport
 Sonmiani Beach
 Sonmiani
 Hub Tehsil
 Lasbela District

References

Lasbela District
Bays of Pakistan
Landforms of Balochistan (Pakistan)
Pakistan Navy bases